Sweet 16 is the second studio album by Dutch three-piece girl group Lisa, Amy & Shelley. It was released in the Netherlands on the 14 October 2011 by Cloud 9 Music. The album peaked at number 45 on the Dutch Albums Chart.

Singles
"Fout Ventje" was released as the lead single from the album on September 2, 2010. "Niemand" was released as the second single on April 29, 2011. "Dicht bij Jou" was released as the third single on August 31, 2011. "Boemerdeboem" was released as the fourth single on February 17, 2012. "Op de Radio" was released as the fifth and final single on September 14, 2012.

Track listing

Charts

Weekly charts

Release history

References

2011 albums